Ghazipur is a city in the state of Uttar Pradesh, India. Ghazipur city is the administrative headquarters of the Ghazipur district, one of the four districts that form the Varanasi division of Uttar Pradesh. 
The city of Ghazipur also constitutes one of the seven distinct tehsils, or subdivisions, of the Ghazipur district.

Ghazipur is well known for its opium factory, established by the British East India Company in 1820 and still the biggest legal opium factory in the world, producing the drug for the global pharmaceutical industry.

History
As per the verbal and folk history. Ghazipur was covered with dense forest during the Vedic era and it was a place for ashrams of saints during that period. The place is related to the Ramayana period. Maharshi Jamadagni, the father of Maharshi Parashurama, is said to have resided here. The famous Gautama Maharishi and Chyavana were given teaching and sermon here in ancient period. Lord Buddha gave his first sermon in Sarnath, which is not far from here. However some sources state that the original name was Gadhipur which was renamed around 1330 after Ghazi Malik.

A 30 ft. high Ashoka Pillar is situated in Latiya, a village 30 km away from the  city near Zamania Tehsil is a symbol of Mauryan Empire. It was declared a monument of national importance and protected by the archeological survey of India. In the report of tours in that area of 1871–72 Sir Alexander Cunningham wrote, "The village receives its name from a stone lat, or monolith".

First in India
The first Scientific Society of India was established first in Ghazipur in 1862 by Sir Syed Ahmed Khan for propagating modern Western knowledge of science, technology and industry. It was a departure from the past in the sense that education made a paradigm shift from traditional humanities and related disciplines to the new field of science and agriculture. Some current institution like Technical Education and Research Institute (TERI), part of post-graduate college PG College Ghazipur, in the city, takes their inspiration from that first Society.

Geography
It has an average elevation of 62 metres (203 feet).

Rivers in the district include the Ganges, Gomati, Gaangi, Beson, Magai, Bhainsai, Tons and Karmanasa River.

Demographics

 India census, Ghazipur city had a population of 231607, out of which males were 121467 and females were 110140 Males constituted 52.445% of the population and females constituted 47.554% of the population. Ghazipur has an average literacy rate of 85.46% (higher than the national average of 74.04%) of which male literacy is 90.61% and female literacy is 79.79%. 11.46% of the population is under 6 years of age and the sex ratio is 904.

Places of interest
Sights in the city include several monuments built by Nawab Sheikh Abdulla, or Abdullah Khan, a governor of Ghazipur during the Mughal Empire in the eighteenth century, and his son. These include the palace known as Chihal Satun, or "forty pillars", which retains a very impressive gateway although the palace is in ruins, and the large garden with a tank and a tomb called the Nawab-ki-Chahar-diwari. The road that starts at the Nawab-ki-Chahar-diwari tomb and runs past the mosque leads, after 10 km, to a matha devoted to Pavhari Baba. The tank and tomb of Pahar Khan, faujdar of the city in 1580, and the plain but ancient tombs of the founder, Masud, and his son are also in Ghazipur, as is the tomb of Lord Cornwallis, one of the major figures of Indian and British history.

Cornwallis is famous for his role in the American Revolutionary War, and then for his time as Governor-General of India, being said to have laid the true foundation of British rule. He was later Lord Lieutenant of Ireland, there suppressing the 1798 Rebellion and establishing the Act of Union. He died in Ghazipur in 1805, soon after his returning to India for his second appointment as Governor-General. His tomb, overlooking the Ganges, is a heavy dome supported on 12 Doric columns above a cenotaph carved by John Flaxman.

The remains of an ancient mud fort also overlook the river, while there are ghats leading to the Ganges, the oldest of which is the ChitNath Ghat. 
Close to ChitNath Ghat, Pavhari Baba ashram is a place of interest for Swami Vivekananda followers. This ashram is further from the original Pavhari Baba underground hermitage caves, and is somewhat less explored by tourists. Those are the caves where Pavhari Baba, whom Swami Vivekananda considered only 2nd to his guru Ramkrishna, used to meditate, sometimes, as the folklores go, feeding only on air (hence the name Pavhari Baba).

Ghazipur opium factory
The opium factory located in the city was established by the British and continues to be a major source of opium production in India. It is known as the Opium Factory Ghazipur or, more formally, the Government Opium and Alkaloid Works. It is the largest factory of its kind in the country and indeed the world. The factory was initially run by the East India Company and was used by the British during the First and Second Opium Wars with China. The factory as such was founded in 1820 though the British had been trading Ghazipur opium before that. Nowadays its output is controlled by the Narcotics Drugs and Psychotropic Substance Act and Rules (1985) and administratively by the Indian government Ministry of Finance, overseen by a committee and a Chief Controller. The factory's output serves the global pharmaceutical industry. Until 1943 the factory only produced raw opium extracts from poppies, but nowadays it also produces many alkaloids, having first begun alkaloid production during World War II to meet military medical needs. Its annual turnover is in the region of 2 billion rupees (approximately 36 or 37 million US dollars), for a profit of about 80 million rupees (1.5 million dollars). It has been profitable every year since 1820, but the alkaloid production currently makes a loss, while the opium production makes a profit. The typical annual opium export from the factory to the US, for example, would be about 360 tonnes of opium.
As well as the opium and alkaloid production, the factory also has a significant R&D program, employing up to 50 research chemists. It also serves the unusual role of being the secure repository for illegal opium seizures in India—and correspondingly, an important office of the Narcotics Control Bureau of India is located in Ghazipur. Overall employment in the factory is about 900. Because it is a government industry, the factory is administrated from New Delhi but a general manager oversees operations in Ghazipur.
In keeping with the sensitive nature of its production, the factory is guarded under high security (by the Central Industrial Security Force), and not easily accessible to the general public. The factory has its own residential accommodation for its employees, and is situated across the banks of river Ganges from the main city of Ghazipur. It is surrounded by high walls topped with barbed wire. Its products are taken by high security rail to Mumbai or New Delhi for further export.

The factory covers about 43 acres and much of its architecture is in red brick, dating from colonial times. Within the grounds of the factory there is a temple to Baba Shyam and a mazar, both said to predate the factory. There is also a solar clock, installed by the British opium agent Hopkins Esor from 1911 to 1913. Rudyard Kipling, who was familiar with opium both medicinally and recreationally, visited the Ghazipur factory in 1888 and published a description of its workings in The Pioneer on 16 April 1888. The text, In an Opium Factory is freely available from Adelaide University's ebook library.

Amitav Ghosh's novel Sea of Poppies deals with the British opium trade in India and much of Ghosh's story is based on his research of the Ghazipur factory. In interview, Ghosh stresses how much of the wealth of the British Empire stemmed from the often unsavoury opium trade, with Ghazipur as one of its centers, but he is also amazed at the scale of the present-day operation.

The Ghazipur Opium Factory may have one more claim to fame, for a rather unusual problem it has. It is infested with monkeys, but these are too narcotic-addled to be a real problem and workers drag them out of the way by their tails.

Climate

Transport
Ghazipur Airport is situated in Ghazipur city. The airport is on the Ghazipur-Mau Road. Airports Authority of India (AAI) is the operator of this Airport.

Notable people

 
 Syed Ishtiaq Ahmed, was Attorney General of Bangladesh
 Abbas Ansari, Declared absconder by Court, Indian politician
 Afzal Ansari, Indian politician, Member of Parliament 2004–2009, 2019–
 Mukhtar Ansari, convicted and jailed criminal turned Indian politician, 5 times MLA from Mau sadar
 Mukhtar Ahmed Ansari, freedom fighter

 Lord Cornwallis, colonial administrator of North America, Ireland, and India died here
 Abdul Hamid, recipient of Param Veer Chakra, India's highest military award.
 Nazir Hussain, Bollywood actor and father of Bhojpuri cinema
 Shrawan Kumar, mathematics professor at University of North Carolina at Chapel Hill
 Khan Shein Kunwar, short story writer and businessman
 George Marten, cricketer
 Kalraj Mishra Governor of Rajasthan
 Mahendra Nath Pandey, Member of Parliament, Minister for Skills Development
 Mangal Pandey, first hero sepoy, who raised the spark of freedom in India
 Sarjoo Pandey, freedom fighter
 Yunus Parvez, actor
 Dipendra Prasad, mathematics professor at TIFR – Mumbai
 Gopal Prasad, mathematics professor at University of Michigan at Ann Arbor
 Furqan Qamar, professor, former Vice chancellor and advisor to Planning Commission (Education)
 Ajay Rai 5 times MLA from Pindra  and former Minister in the state government.
 Baleshwar Rai 1970 Batch IAS Officer,  
 Himanshu Rai, Indian television actor.
 Kuber Nath Rai, writer and literary scholar
 Ram Bahadur Rai, Padmashri recipient
 Shivpujan Rai, freedom fighter, 1942
 Vinod Rai, Padma Bhushan recipient
 Viveki Rai, writer
 Moonis Raza, Vice Chancellor Delhi University and Co. Founder & Rector Jawaharlal Nehru University
 Rahi Masoom Raza, author and poet
 Sahajanand Saraswati, ascetic and leader
 Ram Badan Singh, Padma Bhushan recipient
 Manoj Sinha, Lieutenant Governor Jammu & Kashmir, Ex Member of Parliament, former State Minister of Communications and Minister of State for Railways in the Union Cabinet, Government of India
 Dinesh Lal Yadav, singer and actor & MP
 Suryakumar Yadav, Indian National Cricket Team Player, first cricketer from Ghazipur to play in Indian National Cricket Team

See also
 List of educational institutes in Ghazipur
 National Waterway 1 (India)

References

 
Cities and towns in Ghazipur district
Cities in Uttar Pradesh